William Andrew Quigley (August 1, 1892 – March 24, 1942)  was an American college football player and coach and founder of the Del Mar racetrack.

Quigley was captain and fullback of the University of Pennsylvania football team in 1916. He served as the head football coach at George Washington University in Washington, D.C. from 1921 to 1923. 

After his football career, Quigley became a successful stockbroker and settled in La Jolla, California. There he formed the idea of establishing a horse racetrack on the Del Mar Fairgrounds, inspired by the success of the Santa Anita Park racetrack in Arcadia, California that opened on Christmas 1934. He subsequently won over Bing Crosby and on May 6, 1936, Quigley and Crosby filed for articles of incorporation with California and founded the Del Mar turf Club. Quigley became the original General Manager / Director of Racing of the Del Mar racetrack, which  opened on  July 3, 1937. Quigley was still vice president and general manager of the Del Mar Turf Club when he died at the age of 49 in Pasadena. He is interred at the Waterside Cemetery in Marblehead, Massachusetts near his birthplace.

Head coaching record

References

External links
 

1892 births
1942 deaths
American football fullbacks
American horse racing industry executives
George Washington Colonials football coaches
Penn Quakers football players
Saint Joseph's Hawks football coaches
Sportspeople from Beverly, Massachusetts
Players of American football from San Diego